Coltura is an American environmental activist  group based in Seattle, Washington. The group promotes environmental policies and produces cultural works aimed at ending America's use of gasoline, and advocates for policies to phase out the sales of new gasoline-powered vehicles by 2030.

History

Founding 
Coltura was founded in 2014 by Matthew Metz, an attorney in Seattle, Washington. The name comes from an amalgamation of CO2, the chemical formula for carbon dioxide, and the word culture. The organization was founded as a nonprofit with a mission of "eliminating gasoline use in America by 2040". Metz serves as co-director  along with Janelle London.

Art events 
Coltura has staged street theatre and performance art. In September 2016, they staged performances at gas stations, public events, and streets in Seattle to raise awareness about pollution-emitting gasoline vehicles. At Seattle Design Festival, they displayed an art installation and performed at the First Thursday Art Walk and Bumbershoot. Actors billed as "gasoline ghosts", carrying gasoline hoses and nozzles and dressed in white leotards, drew attention to the air pollution and greenhouse gases created by gasoline use. The "ghosts" showed their affection for gasoline, and comedically chased down cars to inhale their exhaust.

In October 2016, the organisation staged a procession entitled Funeral for Gasoline as part of No Gasoline Day, in which actors carried a casket containing a fuel nozzle from the Space Needle to Downtown Seattle. They won the 2017 Sustainable Seattle Arts and Culture Award for this performance and "for helping change cultural norms about the use of gasoline through mobile and interactive live performance, social media, and imagery and videos challenging the cultural status quo."

In June 2017, the group exhibited The Gas Trap, a 25-foot high clear vinyl bubble connected to the tailpipe of a gasoline-powered car, accompanied by a theatrical piece. The work was a collaboration between Metz, Samaj, the Seattle Design Nerds, Alyssa Norling and Grace Orr. During the performance staged in Westlake Park in Seattle, the performers appeared to be trapped inside and gasping for breath as artificial smoke filled the bubble. The performance was staged again on September 10 at the Roundhouse Community Arts and Recreation Centre in Vancouver, British Columbia.

They held a mural contest in 2017 and collaborated with the artist Craig Cundiff to produce a large mural in the industrial Georgetown district of Seattle. It depicts a boy wearing a mask over his mouth and nose, with a view of the city's congested highways, hazy sky and setting orange sun in the background.

Their gas ghosts and gasoline video have received widespread publicity.

Recharge Required report 
On June 1, 2018, Coltura released a report, Recharge Required, on the status of the State of Washington's agencies adherence to a 2007 law requiring "vehicles in government fleets to run on electricity or biofuel... 'to the extent practicable. According to the report, in contrast to the 100% adherence set as the goal for June 1, 2015, less than 6% of vehicles in use by county and city agencies and 2% of the state's motor pool meet this goal.

Legislative efforts 
In March 2020, Coltura led a coalition to pass Zero Emissions Vehicle legislation in Washington State, and they led a coalition that introduced Washington State legislation mandating that all new cars sold be electric by 2030.

References

External links 
 

Non-profit organizations based in Seattle
Arts organizations based in Washington (state)
Climate change organizations based in the United States
Environmental organizations established in 2014
Environmental organizations based in Washington (state)
Arts organizations established in 2014